The Ostrov Theatre is a private theatre on the corner of Kamennoostrovsky Prospect in Saint Petersburg. It was founded in 1990.

References

External links

Theatres in Saint Petersburg
Kamennoostrovsky Prospekt